Joseph A. Lagana (born December 15, 1978) is an American Democratic Party politician who has represented the 38th Legislative District in the New Jersey Senate since 2018. He served in the New Jersey General Assembly from 2014 to 2018.

Personal
Lagana was raised in Ridgefield and graduated from Ridgefield Memorial High School. He attended Fordham University, where he received a B.A. in history in 2000 and later attended the Western Michigan University Cooley Law School where he received his J.D. in 2004. He has served as a clerk to Superior Court Judge John A. Conte before joining Chasan Leyner & Lamparello, a law firm in Secaucus as a partner. He served on the Ridgefield planning board.

He is married to Jamie Lagana and has three daughters.

Paramus borough council
In April 2009, he moved to Paramus, New Jersey. Lagana and his Democratic running mate defeated two incumbent Republican councilmembers in the Paramus borough council elections of 2011. After Democrats gained a majority of the six-person borough council after the 2012 elections, Lagana was named council president in January 2013.

New Jersey legislature
Lagana declared his candidacy for the 38th district in the November 2013 elections, to succeed Connie Wagner, who was not running for reelection. When Wagner resigned in September, Lagana indicated that he was not interested in filling the remainder of her term; 38th District Democrats chose former Assemblyman and State Senator Paul Contillo to fill the remainder of her term. Lagana won the election and was sworn in on January 14, 2014 at the start of the 2014 session.

Committees 
Committee assignments for the current session are:
Labor, Vice-Chair
Judiciary

District 38 
Each of the 40 districts in the New Jersey Legislature has one representative in the New Jersey Senate and two members in the New Jersey General Assembly. The representatives from the 38th District for the 2022—23 Legislative Session are:
 Senator Joseph Lagana  (D)
 Assemblywoman Lisa Swain  (D)
 Assemblyman Chris Tully  (D)

References

External links
New Jersey Legislature web page
 

|-

1978 births
21st-century American politicians
Fordham University alumni
Living people
New Jersey city council members
Democratic Party members of the New Jersey General Assembly
New Jersey lawyers
Democratic Party New Jersey state senators
People from Paramus, New Jersey
People from Ridgefield, New Jersey
Place of birth missing (living people)
Politicians from Bergen County, New Jersey
Western Michigan University Cooley Law School alumni